The Tajikistan national U-23 football team represents Tajikistan in international U-23 football competitions. It is controlled by the Tajikistan Football Federation and is a member of the Asian Football Confederation.

Competition history

Asian Games

U23 Asian Cup

Recent fixtures

2021

2022

Current squad
 The following players were selected for the 2022 AFC U-23 Asian Cup held in June 2022.

References

Asian national under-23 association football teams
under-23